The 3rd Maryland Volunteer Cavalry (aka "Bradford Dragoons") was a cavalry regiment that served in the Union Army during the American Civil War. The 3rd Maryland Cavalry has the distinction of being the only regiment of "galvanized Yankees" which was actively engaged against Confederate forces.

Service
The 3rd Maryland Cavalry was organized in Baltimore, Maryland beginning August 8, 1863 through January 9, 1864 and mustered in for three-year service under the command of Colonel Charles Carroll Tevis. The regiment was consolidated from ten companies to a battalion of six companies on December 9, 1864.

The regiment was attached to Cavalry Reserve, VIII Corps, Middle Department, to January 1864. Unattached, Defenses of New Orleans, Louisiana, Department of the Gulf, to March 1864. District of LaFourche, Department of the Gulf, to June 1864. District of Morganza, Department of the Gulf, to August 1864. United States forces, Mobile Bay, Department of the Gulf, to December 1865. District of Southern Alabama, Military Division of West Mississippi, to May 1865. 1st Brigade, 2nd Division, Cavalry Corps, Military Division of West Mississippi, to June 1865. Department of Mississippi to September 1865.

The 3rd Maryland Cavalry mustered out September 7, 1865 at Vicksburg, Mississippi.

Detailed service
Duty in the defenses of Baltimore, Md., until January 1864. Ordered to New Orleans, La., then to Madisonville, La., and duty there until March 1864. Expedition to Franklinton February 1-3. Flemming's Ford, Madisonville, February 11. Ordered to Brashear City March 14 and duty there until June. At Morganza until July. Expedition to the Atchafalaya May 30-June 5. Morgan's Ferry Road June 9. Ordered to New Orleans, La., July 1. Dismounted July 7. Sailed from Algiers for Mobile Bay, Ala., August 5. Siege operations against Fort Morgan August 9-23. Capture of Fort Morgan August 23. Post duty at Dauphin's Island and in the District of Southern Alabama until March 1865. Campaign against Mobile March and April. Garrison duty at Fort Gaines until April 30. Ordered to New Orleans, La., April 30, and duty there until June. Ordered to Natchez, Miss., June 20. Duty there and in the Department of Mississippi until September.

Casualties
The regiment lost a total of 95 men during service; 11 enlisted men killed or mortally wounded, 4 officers and 80 enlisted men died of disease.

Commanders
 Colonel Charles Carroll Tevis  was born Washington Carroll Tevis

See also

 List of Maryland Civil War units
 Maryland in the American Civil War

References
 Dyer, Frederick H. A Compendium of the War of the Rebellion (Des Moines, IA: Dyer Pub. Co.), 1908.
Attribution
 

Military units and formations established in 1863
Military units and formations disestablished in 1865
1865 disestablishments in Maryland
Units and formations of the Union Army from Maryland